Jeremy St. Louis (born October 22, 1971 in Winnipeg, Manitoba) is a Canadian TV and radio journalist.  He currently works for CBS Sports HQ and is a former anchor for Fox Soccer Report on Fox Soccer Channel and Fox Sports World Canada, and former Anchor/Producer/Reporter for beIN Sports USA and beIN Sports Canada.

Early career

Jeremy holds a Bachelor of Science degree from Lakehead University.  He graduated from the Southern Alberta Institute of Technology broadcast journalism program in Calgary in the spring of 1996.

His first job was at CKLQ in Brandon, Manitoba in the fall of 1996.  St.Louis worked as a radio news reporter for one year. In the fall of 1997, he accepted his first TV position in Yorkton, Saskatchewan as an anchor/reporter at CICC-TV - a CTV affiliate at the time.

In the spring of 1998, St.Louis accepted a position in Medicine Hat, Alberta as the lead Sports Anchor at CHAT-TV. He worked there until March 2000.

He then moved into public relations for six months at Medicine Hat College.

In December 2000, St.Louis accepted a position as weather anchor & community/news reporter for Global Television in Winnipeg.CKND-TV

Fox Sports USA/Canada

Shortly after September 11, 2001, St.Louis moved into a part-time position as anchor/reporter on Fox Sports World Canada on the international sports highlights show Global Sportslink.

He was hired as a full-time anchor when Sportslink went to seven days a week and was re-branded as the Fox Sports World Report in 2002. He also served as the weekend anchor on Global Sports.

In 2003, St.Louis became lead-anchor alongside Michelle Lissel and was moved from the weekend edition of the program to the weekday edition.

In 2006, the Fox Sports World Report re-launched as the new Fox Soccer Report with St. Louis, Carlos Machado, Derek Taylor and Mitch Peacock as hosts.

In August 2007, St.Louis was one of two Canadian reporters granted a 1-on-1 interview with former England captain David Beckham during his first trip to Toronto in MLS.

St Louis has a secret passion for Manchester United which he revealed in an interview on the  Radio Sounders Show on 15 October 2009. He courted minor controversy when he publicly expressed cynicism about those running Canadian soccer on the program. His appearance led to him becoming an iconic figure in Seattle's soccer community and he was invited to appear on a sold-out Cup Final panel in the city along with Sounders FC General Manager Adrian Hanauer, on the eve of the MLS Cup final of 2009.

In 2010, St.Louis travelled to Madrid, Spain to take part in Fox Soccer Channel coverage of the UEFA Champions League Final. Alongside Fox Sports NFL host Curt Menefee and former US International Eric Wynalda, Los Angeles Galaxy coach Bruce Arena, former English player Warren Barton and Fox Soccer Report analyst Bobby McMahon.

St.Louis co-hosted the network's Champions League Final preview show, filed reports for Fox Soccer Report and worked the sideline for the pre-game show, half-time and post-game show.

His post-match interview with Inter Milan's Wesley Sneijder was the first public confirmation that manager Jose Mourinho was leaving the club for Real Madrid - a coup of sorts for Fox Soccer Channel.

While in Spain he also conducted an in-depth interview with France footballing great and UEFA President Michel Platini.  The interview was aired during the UEFA Champions League Final and was also picked up by Sky Italia and aired in Italy.  The interview generated a number of newspaper articles in the UK

beIN SPORTS USA

On January 31, 2011, he announced his resignation from Fox Soccer Report.  His final show was on February 25, 2011.

After departing Fox, he was hired as a News Director for Golden West Broadcasting, overseeing news production at their two radio stations in Steinbach, Manitoba.  St.Louis spent 18 months there before resigning in September 2012 to re-locate to Miami, FL.

St.Louis joined beIN Sports in January 2013 as on-air talent and Senior Producer.  He started as the host of their flagship panel show 'The Locker Room' and also served as the show's Senior Producer.

In April 2014, St.Louis became the weekday host of beIN's sports news program, 'The Xtra'.  As host of the Xtra, he was also responsible for hosting the network's 2014 World Cup coverage in June–July 2014 alongside Ian Joy in Brazil.  He also hosted nightly coverage of the Copa America in 2015 and the Copa America Centenario in 2016.

In summer of 2016, he was named as the host of Conference USA college football & basketball for the 2016 season and hosted the pregame, halftime and postgame shows for the channel's weekly game broadcasts.  For the football season, he was partnered with former NFL quarterback Donovan McNabb, former NFL running back Ki-Jana Carter and former NFL wide receiver O.J. McDuffie.  During basketball season, St.Louis was joined by McNabb and former George Washington and St.John's head coach Mike Jarvis Sr.

St.Louis also was studio host for Super Bowl 50 and Super Bowl LI for beINSPORTS international.  He also serves as NHL & NFL analyst for beINSPORTS International.

In January of 2020, St.Louis announced he had left beIN SPORTS after opting not to renew his current contract.

CBS Sports

In September 2019, St.Louis joined CBS SPORTS as an anchor on the digital channel CBS Sports HQ.  He anchors on the morning hilights show and also works on the afternoon NFL and college football programs.  He also lends his voice to packages and stories that air on CBS Sports Network and the main CBS Sports channel.

Hall of Fame

On November 22, 2013, St.Louis was officially inducted into the Lindsay Thurber Comprehensive High School 'Hall of Fame' in Red Deer, Alberta.  He became the 60th former student inducted to the Hall and is the first member of his class (1989) to be recognized.

He joined retired RCMP Inspector Roy Beaton and Comedian/Producer Neil Grahn as 2013 inductees.

References

1971 births
American sports announcers
Association football commentators
Canadian television sportscasters
Living people
Journalists from Manitoba
Sportspeople from Winnipeg